The 2004 Wales rugby union tour of Argentina and South Africa was a series of matches played in June 2004. Wales faced Argentina in two test matches on 12 and 19 June 2004, and South Africa on 26 June 2004.

Wales and Argentina drew their series 1–1, while South Africa kept up their winning run against Wales on home soil

Results

References 
 
 
 

2004 rugby union tours
tour
2004
2004 in Argentine rugby union
2004 in South African rugby union
2004
2004
History of rugby union matches between Argentina and Wales
History of rugby union matches between South Africa and Wales